Sessility, or sessile, may refer to:

 Sessility (motility), organisms which are not able to move about
 Sessility (botany), flowers or leaves that grow directly from the stem or peduncle of a plant
 Sessility (medicine), tumors and polyps that lack a stalk
 Sessility (in crystallography), dislocation that is not able to move in the slip plane (as opposed to glissile)

See also
 Sedentism, in cultural anthropology, the practice of living in one place for a long time